Marlène Jobert (born 4 November 1940) is a French actress and author.

Life and career
Jobert was born in Algiers, Algeria, to a Jewish mother, Eliane Azulay and Charles Jobert, who served in the French Air Force. She came to Metropolitan France aged eight.

Jobert debuted as an actress on stage and television. In 1968, she achieved stardom by playing starring roles in the successful comedies Faut pas prendre les enfants du bon Dieu pour des canards sauvages and L'Astragale. She co-starred with Charles Bronson in Rider on the Rain and with Jean-Paul Belmondo in The Married Couple of the Year Two. During the 1970s, Jobert was one of France's popular movie actresses. But during the next decade, she gradually withdrew from film work and concentrated on a new career in children's literature. She is the author and/or narrator of (mainly children's) audio books. She also has written a series of books which cautiously lead on to the appreciation of classical music, e.g. of Mozart, Chopin, and Tchaikovsky.

Jobert and spouse Swedish dental surgeon Dr Walter Green have twin daughters: Eva Green, who is also an actress, and Joy Green, who is a horse breeder in Italy. Her niece Joséphine Jobert is an actress known for the television show Death in Paradise.

Selected filmography
 Therese Desqueyroux (1962), at the end of the film in the scene at the Parisian café 
 Masculin Féminin (1966), with Jean-Pierre Léaud, Chantal Goya. Director: Jean-Luc Godard
 Very Happy Alexander (Alexandre le bienheureux) (1968), with Philippe Noiret, Françoise Brion. Director: Yves Robert
Leontine  (1968), with Françoise Rosay, Bernard Blier. Director : Michel Audiard
 L'Astragale (1968), with Horst Buchholz, Magali Noël. Director: Guy Casaril
 Rider on the Rain (Le Passager de la Pluie) (1970), with Charles Bronson, Annie Cordy, Jill Ireland. Director: René Clément
 Last Known Address (Dernier Domicile Connu) (1970), with Lino Ventura. Director: José Giovanni.
 The Married Couple of the Year Two (Les Mariés de l'An 2) (1971), with Jean-Paul Belmondo, Laura Antonelli. Director: Jean-Paul Rappeneau
  (Touch and Go) (1971), with Michael York, Michel Piccoli. Director: Philippe de Broca
 Catch Me a Spy (1971), with Kirk Douglas, Trevor Howard. Director: Dick Clement
 Ten Days' Wonder (La Décade prodigieuse) (1972), with Orson Welles, Anthony Perkins, Michel Piccoli. Director: Claude Chabrol
 We Won't Grow Old Together (Nous Ne Vieillirons Pas Ensemble) (1972), with Jean Yanne. Director: Maurice Pialat
 Juliette and Juliette (Juliette et Juliette) (1974), with Annie Girardot and Pierre Richard. Director: Remo Forlani
 The Secret (Le Secret) (1974), with Jean-Louis Trintignant, Philippe Noiret. Director: Robert Enrico
  (The Wonderful Crook) (1975), with Gérard Depardieu. Director: Claude Goretta
  (Mad Enough to Kill) (1975), with Tomas Milian, Thomas Waintrop. Director: Yves Boisset
 The Good and the Bad (Le Bon et les Méchants) (1976), with Jacques Dutronc, Jacques Villeret, Bruno Cremer, Brigitte Fossey. Director: Claude Lelouch
  (Julie Gluepot) (1977), with Jean-Claude Brialy, Alexandra Stewart. Director: Philippe de Broca
 The Accuser (L'Imprécateur) (1977), with Jean Yanne, Michel Piccoli, Robert Webber. Director: Jean-Louis Bertucelli
  (Your Turn, My Turn) (1978), with Philippe Léotard. Director: François Leterrier
 A Dangerous Toy (Il Giocattolo) (1979), with Nino Manfredi. Director: Giuliano Montaldo
  (1979), with Jean Rochefort, Helmut Qualtinger. Director: Achim Kurz
 The Police War (1979), with Claude Brasseur, Claude Rich, Jean-François Stévenin. Director: Robin Davis
  (1983), with Jacques Villeret, Bruno Cremer. Director: Daniel Duval
Director:

References

External links

 
 
 

1940 births
French film actresses
Living people
People from Algiers
Pieds-Noirs
Audiobook narrators
Jewish French actresses
Algerian emigrants to France
Algerian Jews
20th-century French actresses
French National Academy of Dramatic Arts alumni
César Honorary Award recipients
Commandeurs of the Ordre des Arts et des Lettres